The Holmes Old Order Amish affiliation is a subgroup of Amish, that is almost only present at the Holmes-Wayne Amish settlement in Ohio. With 140 church districts there in 2009 it is the main and dominant Amish affiliation there, even though there were 61 another church districts of 10 other affiliations in the settlement. It is third in numbers of adherents of all Amish affiliation.

History 

The Holmes County Amish settlement was founded in 1808 and the Holmes Old Order Amish affiliation was the main Amish body there, from which many other Amish affiliations separated, for example the Swartzentruber Amish in 1913 of the Andy Weaver Amish in 1952. In the early 1960s, one of the two major New Order Amish groups emerged in the Holmes County Amish settlement.

Practice and belief 

The Holmes Old Order Amish affiliation is not very conservative concerning the use of technology, but more conservative than the Lancaster Amish affiliation and parts of the Elkhart-LaGrange affiliation, see table below.

Unlike in most other Amish communities, a significant percentage of children from the Holmes County Old Orders attend local public schools, which in turn have often adapted to accommodate Amish practices.

Settlements and districts 

In 2011 the Holmes Old Orders were present in only one state, Ohio, in only two settlements, but with 147 church districts. It represents about 7 percent of the Old Order Amish population, that is about 20,000 people out of about 300,000 in 2015. It is the most geographically concentrated of all other Amish affiliations.

References

Literature 
 Charles Hurst and David McConnell: An Amish Paradox. Diversity and Change in the World's Largest Amish Community,  Johns Hopkins University Press, Baltimore MD 2010 
 Jon Kinney: The Amish of Holmes County: A Culture, A Religion, a Way of Life, Orrville, Ohio 1996.
 Steven Nolt and Thomas J. Meyers: Plain Diversity: Amish Cultures and Identities, Baltimore MD 2007. 
 Donald B. Kraybill: The Riddle of Amish Culture, Baltimore MD 2002. 
 Donald B. Kraybill, Karen M. Johnson-Weiner and Steven M. Nolt: The Amish, Johns Hopkins University Press, Baltimore MD 2013. 

Old Order Amish